La Corte-San Piero is a village in Tuscany, central Italy, administratively a frazione of the comune of Calci, province of Pisa.

The village is composed by the two hamlets of La Corte and San Piero. It is about 10 km from Pisa and 1 km from the municipal seat of La Pieve.

References

Bibliography 
 

Frazioni of the Province of Pisa